The Wan'an Bridge is a historic stone arch bridge over the City River in the town of Jinze, Qingpu District, Shanghai.

Name
The bridge takes its name from a dictum "Peace and serene for thousands of generations, good and prosperous life for all people".

History
The original bridge dates back to the Jingding period (1260–1264) of the Southern Song dynasty (1127–1279), and underwent three renovations, respectively in the ruling of Jiajing Emperor (1522–1566) and in the reign of Wanli Emperor (1573–1620) and in the Qianlong period (1736–1795) of the Qing dynasty (1644–1911). In May 2001, it was designated as a cultural heritage conservation unit of Qingpu District.

architecture
It is of single-arch type. It is the largest stone bridge in the town and is dubbed "Of the 42 bridges, Wan'an Bridge is the top one".

References

Bibliography

External links
 Wan'an Bridge in Jinze, Qingpu District of Shanghai Bridges in China 

Bridges in Shanghai
Arch bridges in China
Bridges completed in the 13th century
Song dynasty architecture
Buildings and structures completed in the 13th century
13th-century establishments in China